The Snohomish School District is the school district serving the city of Snohomish, Washington, United States. The district has a total enrollment of 9500 students and 350 employees. Its superintendent is Kent Kultgen. Snohomish School District is a member of ESD #189.

Schools

Elementary schools
Cascade View Elementary
Cathcart Elementary
Central Primary Center
Dutch Hill Elementary
Emerson Elementary
Little Cedars Elementary (opened fall 2007)
Machias Elementary
Riverview Elementary (opened at the start of the 2014-2015 school year)
Seattle Hill Elementary
Totem Falls Elementary

Middle schools
Centennial Middle School
Valley View Middle School

Athletics
Once each year, the football teams of the middle schools meet in a game called "The Chili Bowl." This name is derived from a tradition that the losing team serves chili to the winning team.

High schools
Glacier Peak High School (opened fall 2008)
Snohomish Senior High School

Alternative schools
AIM High School
Alternative Learning Center
Parent Partnership Program

New school
In the spring of 2004 a bond election was successfully passed, approving the necessary funding for a new high school. The school was to be sited on Cathcart Way, and completion was scheduled for September 2008.

The Seattle Times noted that "the projected cost of [the] new Snohomish-district high school has risen from $68 million to $76 million, [and] the estimated cost of a major renovation to Snohomish High School has climbed from $64 million to $71 million."

According to the Everett Herald, the new school project could receive up to 16.2 million dollars in state grants, as approved by the state superintendent's office in 2006.

The district also built an elementary school, Little Cedars Elementary, which opened in fall 2007.

The new high school was named "Glacier Peak High School" by the committee on the end of May. Its colors are white, blue, and silver. The mascot is a Grizzly Bear.

References

External links
Snohomish School District official website
"Snohomish Then and Now"
Snohomish High School official website
Everett Herald, state grant information
Seattle Times, cost information

School districts in Washington (state)
Education in Snohomish County, Washington